MDMB-FUBICA is an indole-based synthetic cannabinoid that is presumed to be a potent agonist of the CB1 receptor and has been sold online as a designer drug.

It was first detected by the EMCDDA in Sweden in February 2015. It is often sold in e-liquid form for use in an electronic cigarette.

Side effects 

MDMB-FUBICA's indazole analogue MDMB-FUBINACA has been linked to at least 1000 hospitalisations and 40 deaths as a consequence of intoxication as of March 2015.

Legality 

MDMB-FUBICA is banned in Sweden.

See also 

 5F-AB-PINACA
 5F-ADB
 5F-AMB
 5F-APINACA
 AB-FUBINACA
 AB-CHFUPYCA
 AB-CHMINACA
 AB-PINACA
 ADB-CHMINACA
 ADB-FUBINACA
 ADB-PINACA
 AMB-FUBINACA
 APINACA
 APP-FUBINACA
 FUB-APINACA
 MDMB-CHMICA
 MDMB-CHMINACA
 PX-3

References 

Cannabinoids
Designer drugs
Indolecarboxamides
Fluoroarenes